Velocitas is the name of:

Velocitas F.C., South African football club
Velocitas 1897, Dutch football club
Treno Alta Velocità, Italian company